The Brit Award for British Male Solo Artist is an award given by the British Phonographic Industry (BPI), an organisation which represents record companies and artists in the United Kingdom. The accolade is presented at the Brit Awards, an annual celebration of British and international music. The winners and nominees are determined by the Brit Awards voting academy with over one-thousand members, which comprise record labels, publishers, managers, agents, media, and previous winners and nominees. The award was first presented in 1977 as British Male Solo Artist.

British Male Solo Artist has been won by Robbie Williams the most times, with four wins.

Winners and nominees

Artists with multiple wins

Artists with multiple nominations
8 nominations

 Phil Collins
 Elton John

7 nominations
 Robbie Williams

6 nominations

 David Bowie
 George Michael
 Van Morrison
 Cliff Richard
 Paul Weller

5 nominations

 Ian Brown
 Craig David

4 nominations

 Sting
 Will Young

3 nominations

 Aphex Twin
 Badly Drawn Boy
 Calvin Harris
 Paul McCartney
 James Morrison
 Paolo Nutini
 Chris Rea
 Mark Ronson
 Ed Sheeran
 The Streets
 Paul Young

2 nominations

 James Blake
 Elvis Costello
 Eric Clapton
 Dizzee Rascal
 George Ezra
 Fatboy Slim
 David Gray
 Richard Hawley
 Mick Hucknall
 Tom Jones
 Michael Kiwanuka
 Lemar
 Mika
 Morrissey
 Robert Palmer
 Plan B
 Seal
 Sam Smith
 Shakin' Stevens
 Rod Stewart
 Stormzy
 Tricky
 Steve Winwood

Notes
 Paul Young (1984), Ed Sheeran (2012), Ben Howard (2013) also won Brit Award for Best New Artist
 James Bay (2015) also won Brit Award for Rising Star
 Peter Gabriel (1993) also won Brit Award for British Producer of the Year

References

Brit Awards
Awards established in 1977
Awards established in 1982
Awards disestablished in 1977
Awards disestablished in 2021